The Longview Cherokees were a Big State League baseball team based in Longview, Texas that existed in 1952. They went 71-76 in their only year of existence. 

Clem Hausmann and Andy Anderson played for them.

References

Baseball teams established in 1952
Defunct minor league baseball teams
Defunct Big State League teams
Defunct baseball teams in Texas
Baseball teams disestablished in 1952